José Feans (born April 24, 1912, date of death unknown) is an Uruguayan boxer who competed in the 1936 Summer Olympics. In 1936 he was eliminated in the quarter-finals of the heavyweight class after losing his fight to the upcoming silver medalist Guillermo Lovell.

1936 Olympic results
Below is the record of José Feans, a Uruguayan heavyweight boxer who competed at the 1936 Berlin Olympics:

 Round of 32: bye
 Round of 16: defeated Stanislaw Pilat (Poland) on points
 Quarterfinal: lost to Guillermo Lovell (Argentina) by a second-round knockout

External links
José Feans' profile at Sports Reference.com

1912 births
Year of death missing
Heavyweight boxers
Olympic boxers of Uruguay
Boxers at the 1936 Summer Olympics
Uruguayan male boxers